Wayne Sabin (April 1, 1915 – September 14, 1989) was an American male tennis player.

He reached the final of the men's doubles competition at the U.S. National Championships (now US Open). He partnered with Gardnar Mulloy and lost the final in straight sets against Jack Kramer and Ted Schroeder. His best singles performance came in 1939 and 1941 when he reached the quarterfinals at the U.S. National Championships where he was defeated by Welby Van Horn and Don McNeill respectively.

Sabin was ranked No. 6 among the U.S. amateurs in 1937 and 1941.

In 1939 Sabin won the singles title at the National Indoors Tennis Championships, played at the Seventh Regiment Armory in New York.
 
In 2009 Sabin was inducted into the USTA Pacific Northwest Hall of Fame.

Grand Slam finals

Doubles (1 runner-up)

References

1915 births
1989 deaths
American male tennis players
Sportspeople from Des Moines, Iowa
Professional tennis players before the Open Era
Tennis people from Iowa